WBTT (105.5 FM) is a Rhythmic Top 40 radio station serving Southwest Florida—primarily Lee and Collier counties. The iHeartMedia, Inc. outlet broadcasts with an ERP of 23.5 kW and its COL is Naples Park, Florida. The station's current slogan is "Southwest Florida's Party Station," complemented by their on-air guarantee of "30 minutes of non-stop hip-hop."

History
Prior to its flip to Rhythmic Top 40 in the Spring of 2000, WBTT's previous format was Country, when it was WQNU.

They are also the third FM station in the United States to use the WBTT call letters; the other two were WRNW/Milwaukee, Wisconsin and WYDB/Dayton, Ohio, both also owned by Clear Channel (now iHeartMedia)

Current programming

On-air staff

Current
 Flyin' Brian
 Brittany Gonzalez
 Eric The Funky 1
 DJ Quest
 Brooklyn
 DJ KS-1

Past
 Scrap "Scrappy" Jackson
 First Lady Niki
 Bo Matthews
 Omar The Big 'O' 
 Trey Peezy
 DJ Pat Pat
 La Loca
 Jason Dylan
 Jade McClelland
 DJ Ramo G

External links
Station website

Rhythmic contemporary radio stations in the United States
BTT
Radio stations established in 1986
1986 establishments in Florida
IHeartMedia radio stations